Hamzah bin Hussein,  (born 29 March 1980) is the fourth son of King Hussein bin Talal of Jordan overall and the first by his American-born fourth wife, Queen Noor. He was named Crown Prince of Jordan in 1999, a position he held until his older half-brother, King Abdullah II, rescinded it in 2004. He is a member of the Hashemite dynasty, the royal family of Jordan since 1921, and is a 41st-generation direct descendant of Muhammad. Hamzah is currently believed to be under house arrest since April 2021, after being accused of attempting to destabilise the Kingdom of Jordan and fomenting unrest. Hamzah renounced his title of prince in April 2022.

Biography
Born on 29 March 1980, Hamzah Bin Al Hussein claims ancestry with the Islamic prophet Muhammad through the Hashemite family. Queen Noor states in her autobiography that she and King Hussein named Hamzah after Hamza ibn Abd al-Muttalib.

Hamzah received his elementary education in Jordan and Amman, and then attended Harrow School in England. He then joined the Royal Military Academy Sandhurst, passing out as a commissioned officer in the Jordan Arab Legion in December 1999, with a number of prizes including the Sandhurst Overseas Sword, granted to the best overseas cadet and the HRH Prince Saud Abdullah Prize, presented to the cadet with the best aggregate mark in academic subjects.

Serving then as an officer in the Jordan Arab Army's 40th Armored Brigade, Hamzah attended a number of military courses and attachments in Jordan, the UK, Poland, Germany and the US. Currently holding the rank of Brigadier in the Jordan Arab Army, he served with the Jordan-United Arab Emirates force operating in former Yugoslavia under the umbrella of international peacekeepers. In the year 2006, he graduated from Harvard University.

Hamzah was sworn in as Regent on numerous occasions and deputized for King Abdullah II on a number of missions in the Kingdom and abroad. He headed the Royal Advisory Committee on the Energy Sector. He is also the Honorary President of the Jordan Basketball Federation, and is the chairman of the board of trustees of the Royal Automobile Museum, the President of the Royal Aero sports Club of Jordan and the President of Al-Shajarah (Tree) Protection Society.

Hamzah is a qualified rotor and fixed wing aircraft pilot, and participates in other sports such as Jujitsu and target-shooting.

Succession issue
On 7 February 1999, King Hussein died and his eldest son Prince Abdullah bin Hussein ascended to the throne of Jordan, having two weeks previously been designated to succeed his father as ruler in place of the king's brother, Crown Prince Hassan bin Talal. On the same day, in compliance with his father's wish, King Abdullah II decreed that he, in turn, would be succeeded not by a son of his own but by his half-brother, Hamzah, who was therefore accorded the title of crown prince.

Nearly six years later, on  28 November 2004, King Abdullah removed Hamzah as crown prince. In a letter from Abdullah to Hamzah, read on Jordanian state television, he said, "Your holding this symbolic position has restrained your freedom and hindered our entrusting you with certain responsibilities that you are fully qualified to undertake."

No successor to the title was named at the time, but some analysts believed it probable that Abdullah intended to name his own son, Prince Hussein, to succeed him at some point in the future. Article 28(B) of Jordan's constitution provides that the king's eldest son automatically succeeds to the crown upon the monarch's death unless the king has designated one of his brothers to inherit the throne as crown prince, but Abdullah II confirmed that his son Hussein would succeed him by designating him as crown prince on 2 July 2009.

House arrest

On 3 April 2021, the BBC published a video of Hamzah in which he reported that he has been placed under house arrest as part of a crackdown on critics. It was stated that the video had been passed to the BBC through Hamzah's lawyer. On 7 April 2021, King Abdullah II publicly hinted that his tension with Hamzah, who had pledged loyalty to him two days after his house arrest began, was ending and that Hamzah was now "in his palace under my protection." Abdullah also stated that the crisis which resulted in Hamzah's house arrest started when Jordan's military chief of staff visited Hamzah and warned him to stop attending meetings with critics of the government. In April 2022, Hamzah relinquished his royal title of prince, stating his "personal convictions" were not in line with "the approaches, trends and modern methods of our institutions". A month earlier, he had reportedly apologized to the King in a letter, wishing to "turn the page on this chapter in our country's and our family's history". In May 2022, the King formally announced that Hamzah had been put under house arrest and his communications and movements were limited due to his "erratic behavior and aspirations".

Marriages and family
Hamzah married his second cousin, Princess Noor bint Asem bin Nayef, at Al Baraka Palace in Amman on 29 August 2003. The official wedding was held on 27 May 2004. Hamzah and Noor divorced on 9 September 2009. The couple had a daughter:
 Princess Haya bint Hamzah (born 18 April 2007)

On 12 January 2012, Hamzah married Basmah Bani Ahmad Al-Outom. The couple have four daughters and two sons:
 Princess Zein bint Hamzah (born 3 November 2012)
 Princess Noor bint Hamzah (born 5 July 2014)
 Princess Badiya bint Hamzah (born 8 April 2016)
 Princess Nafisa bint Hamzah (born 7 February 2018)
 Prince Hussein bin Hamzah (born 8 November 2019)
 Prince Muhammad bin Hamzah (born 8 February 2022)

Honours

National
 
 Knight Grand Cordon (Special Class) of the Supreme Order of the Renaissance
 Knight Grand Cordon of the Order of the Star of Jordan
 Knight Grand Cordon of the Order of Independence
 Knight Officer of the Order of Military Merit

Foreign
 :
 Recipient of the Medal of Ahmad Al-Fateh
 :
 Knight Grand Cross of the Order of Merit of the Italian Republic
 :
 Knight Grand Cross of the Order of Saint Olav
 :
 Knight Grand Cross of the Order of Orange-Nassau

Award
 : Recipient of the United Nations Peace Medal

References

External links
Queen Noor (2003) Leap of Faith: Memoirs of an Unexpected Life, Miramax Books, 

1980 births
Living people
Jordanian princes
Harvard University alumni
House of Hashim
People educated at Harrow School
Graduates of the Royal Military Academy Sandhurst
Jordanian generals
Crown Princes of Jordan
Jordanian people of Syrian descent
Jordanian people of Lebanese descent
Jordanian people of English descent
Jordanian people of Swedish descent
Grand Cordons of the Order of Independence (Jordan)
Knights Grand Cross of the Order of Merit of the Italian Republic
Knights Grand Cross of the Order of Orange-Nassau
Sons of kings
Heirs apparent who never acceded